Wind, Sky and Diamonds is an album by Hungarian jazz guitarist Gábor Szabó featuring performances recorded in 1967 for the Impulse! label.

Track listing
 "San Franciscan Nights" (Eric Burdon, Vic Briggs, John Weider, Barry Jenkins, Danny McCulloch) - 3:18
 "A Day in the Life" (John Lennon, Paul McCartney) - 3:20
 "Twelve Thirty (Young Girls Are Coming to the Canyon)" (John Phillips) - 3:00
 "To Sir With Love" (Don Black, Mark London) - 2:28
 "White Rabbit" (Grace Slick) - 2:30
 "Guantanamera" (Joseíto Fernández) - 3:09
 "Saigon Bride" (Joan Baez, Nina Duscheck) - 2:10
 "The End of Life" (John Bahler, Tom Bahler, Gábor Szabó) - 2:55
 "Lucy in the Sky With Diamonds" (John Lennon, Paul McCartney) - 3:44
 "Are You There?" (Gábor Szabó, Steve Allen) - 3:31
 "W.C. Fields" (John Bahler, Tom Bahler) - 3:40
Recorded by Eddie Brackett at Western Recorders in Los Angeles, California on September 12, 1967 (tracks 3 & 5-7), September 13, 1967 (tracks 4, 9 & 10)  and September 14, 1967 (tracks 1, 2, 8 & 11)

Personnel
Gábor Szabó - guitar, recitation
Mike Melvoin - piano, harpsichord
Bill Plummer - sitar
Dennis Budimir, Herb Ellis, Louis Morell, Howard Roberts - guitar
Carol Kaye, Ray Pohlman - electric bass
Jimmy Gordon, John Guerin - drums
Victor Feldman, Emil Richards - percussion
The California Dreamers: Ron Hicklin, Al Capps, Loren Farber, John Bahler, Tom Bahler, Ian Freebairn-Smith, Sally Stevens, Sue Allen, Jackie Ward - vocals

References

Impulse! Records albums
Gábor Szabó albums
1967 albums
Albums produced by Bob Thiele